Davidson is a suburban town located in northern Mecklenburg and Iredell counties, North Carolina, United States, on the banks of Lake Norman. It is a suburb in the Charlotte metropolitan area. The population was 10,944 at the 2010 census, and in 2019 the estimated population was 13,054. The town was founded in 1837 with the establishment of the Presbyterian Davidson College, named for Brigadier General William Lee Davidson, a local Revolutionary War hero. The land for Davidson College came from Davidson's estate, a large portion of which was donated by his son.

History
John Davidson, described as "a prosperous Ulster merchant", was a member of the Davidson family who migrated south from Pennsylvania. Davidson's Creek was the westernmost settlement in North Carolina at the time, and according to Robert Ramsey's Carolina Cradle, it "became the nucleus of the Centre Presbyterian Congregation." John Davidson's son William went on to serve in the American Revolution, eventually becoming a major. Maj. William Davidson was a cousin of Col. William Davidson, the first state senator from Buncombe County, North Carolina, who in turn was a cousin of Gen. William Lee Davidson, for whom Davidson College was named. Gen. Davidson's son William Lee Davidson II sold 469 acres (1.90 km2) to the Concord Presbytery to start Davidson College.

The history of the town of Davidson is inextricably linked to Davidson College, which predated the surrounding community and influenced its development. Although Davidson's growth in the late nineteenth and early twentieth centuries typified small railroad towns throughout the Piedmont, the presence of the college created a unique village. The tree-shaded campus filled with classically inspired architecture distinguished Davidson from other communities. The sway of the school also extended beyond the campus to the entire town, influencing commerce, culture, and the character of its architecture. The 1869 Branson's business directory recorded four dry goods merchants in the town as well as a cabinetmaker, a miller, and three physicians.

Soon after the arrival of the railroad, Davidson became a shipping point for cash crops, especially cotton, and a service center for farmers. In common with other railroad towns in the region, textile investors constructed cotton mills and mill villages along the rail corridor. The Linden Cotton Factory, erected in 1890 on Depot Street, was the first textile plant in Davidson, and in 1908, the Delburg Cotton Mills was constructed nearby. Two thousand bales of cotton were sold at Davidson annually in the early 1900s.

In 1891, the name of the town was changed from "Davidson College" to "Davidson", emblematic of the community's expanding roles for town and gown alike. Davidson's cotton mills spurred the growth of the town, and by 1910 the population of Davidson had reached 500 residents, climbing to 1,500 by the 1920s. Between 1900 and the Great Depression, the business district evolved from a commingling of stores and residences into contiguous rows of one- and two-story, brick commercial buildings. The heart of downtown – opposite the college – contained a full complement of small-town stores and services, including four general merchandise stores, a drug store, a laundry, tailor shop, two barber shops, a hardware store, a post office, a bank, and several restaurants. Physicians, building contractors, and milliners also had Main Street addresses. Behind Main Street along the railroad tracks stood the small 1897 Southern Railway Depot, a livery, flour mill, sawmill, cotton gins, a cottonseed oil company, a blacksmith shop, and a buggy manufacturer. 
 
The demise of cotton farming and decline of other agricultural pursuits in the region effectively ended the town's role as a farming service center. Meanwhile, improved highways and the advent of I-77 encouraged residents to frequent larger department stores in the cities, especially Charlotte,  to the south. In more recent years, the emergence of suburban shopping centers around Davidson accelerated the town's status to an all-purpose retail market.

Today, the tremendous development around Charlotte has stimulated Davidson's growth to its current population of more than 10,000 people. Local downtown businesses, now characterized by restaurants and specialty shops, cater to this new market. Prestigious, nationally known Davidson College has made the town an intellectual and cultural center, drawing into its orbit a sizable professional class.

Beginning with the General Plan in 1993, continuing through the Land Plan of 1995 and the Planning Ordinance of 2001, the town has advocated for and implemented smart growth principles, including pedestrian orientation (resulting in a ban on drive-thru's), mixed-use development, affordable housing, open space preservation, and connectivity. An emphasis on design has been a consistent theme in each resulting regulatory document. Additionally, the town of Davidson received National Register Historic District status in 2009 for the historic core of the town, which includes downtown.

Geography

A portion of the town extends north into Iredell County. The western edge of the town follows the shoreline of Lake Norman, a large reservoir on the Catawba River. On the northwestern edge,  Davidson is bordered by Lake Davidson, a runoff basin of Lake Norman. Davidson is bordered to the south by the town of Cornelius.

Interstate 77 passes through the western side of Davidson, with access from Exit 30. I-77 leads south  to Charlotte and north the same distance to Statesville. North Carolina Highway 115 is Davidson's Main Street; it leads north  to Mooresville and south  to Huntersville.

Demographics

2020 census

As of the 2020 United States census, there were 15,106 people, 4,336 households, and 3,011 families residing in the town.

2010 census
According to the 2010 census, there were 10,944 people and 4,253 housing units in the town. The racial makeup of the town was 87.8% White, 6.4% African American, 0.2% Native American, 2.8% Asian, 3.8% Hispanic or Latino and 1.7% from two or more races.

There were approximately 2,429 family households, out of which 34.2% had children under the age of 18 living with them, 56.3% were married couples living together, 7.3% had a female householder with no husband present, 2.6% had a male householder with no wife present, and 33.8% were non-families. 26.4% of all households were made up of individuals, and 7.3% had someone living alone who was 65 years of age or older. The average household size was 2.4 and the average family size was 3.11.

In the town, the population was spread out, with 22.8% under the age of 18, 14.9% from 20 to 29, 21.9% from 35 to 49, 16.2% from 50 to 64, and 12.5% who were 65 years of age or older. The median age was 35.7 years. 47.5% of the population was male and 52.5% was female.

The median household income was $83,730, and the median income for a family was $124,045. Males who work full-time and year-round had a median income of $93,833 versus $56,178 for females. The per capita income for the town was $49,065. About 4.8% of families and 6.4% of the population were below the poverty line, including 6.5% of those under age 18 and 3.9% of those age 65 or over.

Education

K-12 schools
The residents of Davidson attend the Charlotte-Mecklenburg Schools. Davidson School is the zoned school for grades K-8. High school students attend William A. Hough High School in Cornelius.

Elementary schools include Davidson Elementary. Following the shutdown of Davidson IBMYP Middle School in 2011, students were re-assigned to J. M. Alexander Middle School. There was no middle school located in Davidson for nearly 10 years. However, beginning around 2019, Davidson Elementary has been expanded to Davidson K-8, although some students leave to attend magnet, charter, or private schools.

Private schools
 Davidson Day School, located at 750 Jetton Road in Davidson
 Davidson Green School, located in downtown Davidson, 511, South Main St

Charter schools
 Community School of Davidson

Colleges and universities
Davidson is home to Davidson College, a highly selective liberal arts college located in the heart of town on Main Street. Davidson College is ranked 15th in National Liberal Arts Colleges, and the top school in the South,. It is consistently ranked in the top ten best liberal arts colleges in the country, and has graduated 23 Rhodes scholars. Some notable attendees of the college are Woodrow Wilson, the 28th President of the United States, George Osborne, former British Chancellor of the Exchequer, and current NBA player Stephen Curry.

Libraries

Davidson is served by a branch of the Public Library of Charlotte and Mecklenburg County.  The library is located on the Green in Davidson.

Employers 
Davidson is home to many businesses small and large alike. Since Davidson is situated on an old railroad line it has attracted many industrial companies for corporate and commercial business. Two well-known companies have large offices in Davidson. Davidson has attracted these companies due to  the influence of Davidson College and Charlotte Douglas International Airport being 25 miles away. All while being a short drive to the up and coming Uptown Charlotte.

Trane/Ingersoll Rand
Davidson is  home to Ingersoll Rand US Corporate Headquarters. In 2020, the Beaty Street Corporate headquarters also became home to Trane  a recent subsidiary of  Ingersoll Rand. The company has a five-building complex on one of Lake Davidson's Peninsulas. Ingersoll Rand employs 1600 Davidsonians. Ingersoll Rand, an industrials company has many well-known brands other than Trane such as Club Car and CompAir.

MSC Industrial Direct
MSC Industrial Direct, located on Harbor Place Drive can be viewed from I-77 when traveling south. This building houses MSC's Customer Support Center/Corporate Headquarters.  MSC Industrial Direct is  Industrial Supplier, a Fortune 1000 company, and is on the NYSE under the ticker MSM company. MSC Industrial Direct employs 700 people in the Davidson Area.

Davidson College has also created many opportunities for the community employing over 500 residents. Davidson College also created the Hurt HUB. The Hurt HUB at Davidson College is a place for business professionals in the Davidson Area to meet young college students and create new networking opportunities.

Points of interest
 Davidson College
 Davidson College Arboretum
 Lake Norman

Awards and recognitions
 Fannie Mae Foundation Maxwell Award: to the Davidson Housing Coalition for the Bungalows (2001)<
 North Carolina Housing Finance Agency Multi-Family Housing Award: for the Bungalows (2001)
 National Environmental Protection Agency Smart Growth Award for Overall Excellence in Town Planning and Design (2004)
 Exit 30 Master Plan - Marvin Collins Outstanding Planning Award for Smart Growth (2004)
 Centralina Council of Government Sustainable Environment for Quality of Life: Best Practices Award for Davidson's Aging in Place Task Force (2006)
 North Carolina League of Municipalities Green Challenge: Level One Award (2008) 
 Recognition as a National Historic District (2009)
 North Carolina Main Street Community (2009)
 Tree City USA (2010) 
 Bike Friendly Community - Bronze (2010)
 Davidson Police Department - Accreditation by Commission for Accreditation of Law Enforcement Agencies (CALEA) (2011)
 Comprehensive Plan - North Carolina American Planning Association (NCAPA) Planning Award - Honorable Mention (2011) 
 Affordable Housing - NCAPA Planning Award (2011) 
 Circles at 30 - NCAPA Planning Award (2011) 
 Fit Community - Bronze (2011-2014)
 Walk Friendly Community - Bronze (2011)
 Great Main Street Award, North Carolina Chapter of the American Planning Association (2013) 
 North Carolina Land Trust Government Conservation Partner of the Year Award (2014)

Notable people
See also: List of notable Davidson College alumni
 Robert J. Abernethy, entrepreneur and philanthropist
 Matt Ballard, former college football head coach
 Elizabeth Bradford, artist
 John Candelaria, former Major League Baseball pitcher
 Steph Curry, NBA player
 William Lee Davidson, officer in the North Carolina militia and Continental Army during the American Revolutionary War; also namesake of the town
 Hayes Grier, Internet personality
 Nash Grier, Internet personality
 Will Grier, NFL quarterback
 Alan Gustafson, NASCAR crew chief
 Herb Jackson, professor of art at Davidson College
 Matt Kunitz, the creator of the hit reality tv show "Wipeout"
 Lenny McAllister, political commentator
 Gene McEver, American football player and coach
 Josef Newgarden, IndyCar driver
 Anna Chao Pai, geneticist and professor emerita at Montclair State University
 Thomas W. Ross, former president of Davidson College and current president of the University of North Carolina system
 Mary T. Martin Sloop, instrumental to the improvement of healthcare and education in the mountains of North Carolina

References

External links

 Town of Davidson official website
 Lake Norman Chamber of Commerce
 Davidson branch of the Public Library of Charlotte and Mecklenburg County

Towns in Iredell County, North Carolina
Towns in Mecklenburg County, North Carolina
Towns in North Carolina
Populated places established in 1837